Pseudorhina is an extinct genus of stem angel shark seemingly restricted to the Mesozoic of Europe. It is represented by several articulated individuals as well as isolated teeth. There are four species.

Taxonomy and relationships

Pseudorhina is currently the oldest known angel shark genus. It is thought to represent a basal offshoot within Squatiniformes and has been placed in a monotypic family called Pseudorhinidae. While most fossil genera and species of angel shark are represented solely by isolated teeth, Pseudorhina is relatively well known from articulated individuals. This allows a rare opportunity for detailed comparisons with other genera known from articulated remains including the extant Squatina. Modern angel sharks are much more specialized than Pseudorhina, neurocrania show little morphological disparity in extant Squatina.

Distribution and temporal range
All late Jurassic angel shark teeth currently known are attributed to Pseudorhina. The genus is currently restricted to Europe. P. acanthoderma is known from the late Kimmeridgian of Germany in layers which produce ammonites such as Hybonoticeras beckeri and Lithacoceras ulmense. It is known from both isolated teeth and associated material. P. alifera is known from the early Tithonian of Germany and similar teeth currently labeled as P. aff. alifera have been described from the Valanginian of France. Associated specimens are known. There seems to be another undescribed species with a unique tooth morphologynfrom the Tithonian of Germany. P. frequens is known only from isolated teeth from the early Kimmeridgian. P. crocheti is known from more than 250 isolated teeth from the Valanginian of France.

Gallery

References

Prehistoric cartilaginous fish genera
Squatiniformes